The Slaughter County Roller Vixens (SCRV) is a roller derby league based in Kitsap County, Washington, US.  Founded in 2006, the league currently comprises two teams, and a mixed team which competes against teams from other leagues.

Kitsap County was originally named Slaughter County.  The league competed in their home county for the first time in April 2008.

The Vixens joined the Women's Flat Track Derby Association (WFTDA) in September 2008.  In 2010, the league ran the Wild West Showdown, a major tournament involving nineteen WFTDA leagues.  The travel team gradually rose in the WFTDA rankings, reaching eleventh in the West Region by the third quarter of 2011.

References

Kitsap County, Washington
Roller derby leagues established in 2006
Roller derby leagues in Washington (state)
2006 establishments in Washington (state)